Dawson Simpson (born 17 February 1989) is a former professional Australian rules footballer who played for the Geelong Football Club and Greater Western Sydney Giants in the Australian Football League (AFL). He played as a ruckman, and was drafted by Geelong from the Murray Bushrangers in the 2007 national draft. 

In October 2015, he joined GWS as an unrestricted free agent after only 28 games for Geelong over an eight-year period. 

He retired at the conclusion of the 2019 AFL season.

Statistics
Statistics are correct to end of round 5, 2015. Averages are in brackets.

References

External links

 

Geelong Football Club players
Living people
1989 births
Murray Bushrangers players
Australian rules footballers from Victoria (Australia)
Greater Western Sydney Giants players